The Department of History at Harvard University (also known as the Harvard History Department) is a department of history located in Cambridge, Massachusetts, United States. The school offers bachelor's degrees in history, master's degrees in history, doctorate degrees in history, and a certificate in digital history.

Academics 
The Harvard University Department of History is home to some of the world's leading and most renowned scholars in history. The department focuses on multiple areas within history "including social life, the economy, culture, thought, and politics. Students of history study individuals, groups, communities, and nations from every imaginable perspective." The department also runs the History of Science program, which "deals with important questions about the rise and impact of science, medicine, and technology, both east and west, and at all periods, including the very recent past."

Undergraduate students can concentrate in history and receive an A.B. degree. Students are also able to take courses in joint-degree programs, including the Joint Concentration in Ancient History (Greek and Roman), the Joint Concentration in East Asian History, and the Joint Concentration in Near Eastern History.

Graduate students can work towards a M.A. or Ph.D. in history. Students may also work towards a joint J.D. / Ph.D. degree.

The department is affiliated with a number of research centers and programs at Harvard, including:
 Center for Hellenic Studies
 Charles Warren Center for Studies in American History
 Harvard Collection of Historical Scientific Instruments
 Harvard Ukrainian Research Institute
 W. E. B. Du Bois Institute
 Weatherhead Center for International Affairs

Harvard and Slavery 
The Harvard and Slavery initiative was established in 2006 in order to recognize and "research the historical connections between Harvard University and slavery". The program began as Harvard and Slavery: Seeking a Forgotten History, which summarized undergraduate research linking the history of slavery to local history. According to professor of history Sven Beckert, "We want to inspire others to dig deeper into this history, but even more so we want to encourage a broader debate on what this history means for us today." A report on the findings of this research (Full Report of the Findings of History 84G) was subsequently published in 2011. They found that Harvard was supported by donations from a slave-based economy, affiliated with scholars who promoted ideas of scientific racism, and hired professors and students who owned slaves.

In 2016, then Harvard University President Drew Gilpin Faust and Congressman John Lewis unveiled a plaque dedicated to the memory of four enslaved people, Titus, Venus, Bilhah, and Juba, who worked at the university. Scholars described this ceremony as an important step in recognizing the historic legacy of slavery. In 2017, a memorial was built at Harvard Law School to honor “the enslaved whose labor created wealth that made possible the founding of the Harvard Law School." The next University President, Lawrence S. Bacow, announced another $5 million would be invested to continue investigating Harvard's ties to slavery, led by Radcliffe Institute for Advanced Study Dean Tomiko Brown-Nagin.

Rankings 
The Department of History is frequently cited as one of the premier institutions for the study of history. U.S. News & World Report ranks the department at #4.

Notable faculty 
 David Armitage
 Sven Beckert
 Allan M. Brandt
 Vincent Brown
 Tomiko Brown-Nagin
 Sidney Chalhoub
 Joyce Chaplin
 Lizabeth Cohen
 Emma Dench
 Peter Galison
 Drew Gilpin Faust
 Peter Gordon
 Andrew Gordon
 Annette Gordon-Reed
 Evelynn Hammonds
 Tamar Herzog
 Maya Jasanoff
 Walter Johnson
 Cemal Kafadar
 Joseph Koerner
 Ewa Lajer-Burcharth
 Jill Lepore
 Charles S. Maier
 Erez Manela
 Tiya Miles
 Khalil Gibran Muhammad
 Naomi Oreskes

References

Harvard University
History departments in the United States
History of Harvard University